Sajitha Betti is an Indian actress known for her works in Malayalam television serials and films.

Biography
Sajitha Betti belongs to a community of Urdu-speaking Muslims from Hyderabad. She is married to Shamas. She has two elder brothers and two sisters; Wahida Betti, Mothilal, Sahida Betti and Heeralal. She married Shamas on 12 August 2012. She has featured in many albums and advertisements.

Filmography

Film

Television 

As Host 
 Patturumaal season 8 (Kairali TV)
 Meharuba (JaiHind TV)
Super Chef (Asianet Plus) as guest/presenter
Ruchibedam (ACV) as guest

Other shows
Celebrity Kitchen Magic (Kairali) as contestant
Don't Do Don't Do (Asianet plus) as participant
Onnum Onnum Moonu (Mazhavil) as guest
Ividingananu Bhai (Mazhavil) as guest
Super Star (Amrita) as guest
Veettamma (Kairali) as guest
Patturumal (Kairali) as special performer
Ningalkkariyamo (Surya TV) as guest
Sarigama (Asianet) as guest
Manassiloru Mazhavillu (Kairali) as guest
Coat Eeswaran (Surya TV) as guest
Comedy Stars (Asianet) as guest
Comedy Express (Asianet) as special judge
Asianet Television Awards (Asianet) as Dancer
Humorous Talk Show (Asianet Plus) as guest
Surya Challenge (Surya TV) as guest
Surya Music (Surya Music) as guest
Dhwani Tarang (Kairali TV) as Performer
Ishal Nilavu (Kairali TV) as Performer
Hundred Days of Keerthi Chakra (Asianet) as Performer
Film Box (Kaumudy) as guest

Albums
 Hello Marhaba
 Friends
 Dost & Dost
 Sarvamangale
 Avalum Njanum
 Manikiakkallu

Advertisements
Asian Wood Palace
 Arafa Gold
 Data Lucky Center
 Arabian Jewellers
 Atlas Jewellery
 Arafa Jewellery
 Golden Couple
GITD
Aster
Manorama Magazine
Oren Kitchen World
Viva Wedding Palace
EMKE Silks

References

External links
 

Living people
Year of birth missing (living people)
Place of birth missing (living people)
Child actresses in Malayalam cinema
Actresses in Malayalam cinema
Actresses in Malayalam television
Actresses in Tamil cinema
Actresses in Telugu cinema